Anthony "Tony" Waters  (10 April 1928 – 20 November 1987) was a field hockey player from Australia, who won the bronze medal with the Men's National Team at the 1964 Summer Olympics in Tokyo, Japan.

External links
 
Anthony Water's profile at Sports Reference.com

1928 births
1987 deaths
Australian male field hockey players
Olympic field hockey players of Australia
Field hockey players at the 1964 Summer Olympics
Olympic bronze medalists for Australia
Olympic medalists in field hockey
Medalists at the 1964 Summer Olympics